Hershel Wayne Gober (born December 21, 1936) is a former government official and Vietnam War veteran. He served as acting United States Secretary of Veterans Affairs (VA) on two occasions during the administration of Bill Clinton: first from July 1, 1997, until January 2, 1998, between the resignation of Secretary Jesse Brown and the appointment of Togo D. West Jr. as acting secretary, and the second time from July 25, 2000, until January 20, 2001, after the resignation of Secretary West; this time Gober served in the post until the end of the Clinton presidency.

He started out in the VA as deputy secretary, serving from February 4, 1993, until August 10, 2000. Gober was also briefly secretary-designate, when Clinton named him on July 31, 1997, to replace Jesse Brown. However, the nomination was withdrawn before Senate action on October 27 the same year because of fears that nomination hearings for Gober would become heated due to questions about a 1993 claim of sexual misconduct made against him; he also wished to stay as Deputy Secretary.

During his tenure Gober, as a close and longtime aide, played an important role in the Clinton-era VA. He headed a delegation that traveled to Vietnam to seek the fullest possible accounting of missing veterans. He was also active in improving health care and expanding clinics for veterans.

Before serving in the VA, Gober was director of the Arkansas Department of Veterans Affairs from January 4, 1988, to February 4, 1993, during Clinton's tenure as governor.

Military service
Gober served in the U.S. Marine Corps from 1956 to 1959. He served in the U.S. Army from 1961 to 1978, retiring as a Major.

Service in Vietnam
Gober served two tours in Vietnam. In addition to his combat duties, at one point he worked with an American-Vietnamese team that produced songs to help sway Vietnamese public opinion in favor of the American and South Vietnamese causes and to encourage the leadership in Washington to favor reaching the hearts and minds of the Vietnamese people. Later, in 1969, he was wounded while serving as a company commander.

Music
In 1970, Gober released a 45 rpm single, "Picture of a Man", which received some airplay on popular music radio stations.

Gober had at least five single releases and one album as a recording artist; the first two were as Hershel Almond on Ace and Challenge in 1959. The others were on ABC ("The Proud American", 1966), "Tee Pee" (1967) and "Buddah" (1969).

See also
Unsuccessful nominations to the Cabinet of the United States

References

External links
Encyclopedia of Arkansas History & Culture entry

Profile at American President: An Online Reference Resource
Recordings of Gober singing songs in Vietnam are available in the Edward G. Lansdale collection at the Hoover Institution Archives, Stanford University
 

|-

|-

1936 births
Living people
20th-century American politicians
United States Army personnel of the Vietnam War
Clinton administration cabinet members
Military personnel from Arkansas
People from Drew County, Arkansas
Recipients of the Soldier's Medal
Rejected or withdrawn nominees to the United States Executive Cabinet
State cabinet secretaries of Arkansas
United States Deputy Secretaries of Veterans Affairs
United States Marine Corps officers